"I'll Never Get Out of This World Alive" is a song by Hank Williams.

I'll Never Get Out of This World Alive may also refer to:
 I'll Never Get Out of This World Alive (album), a 2011 album by Steve Earle
 I'll Never Get Out of This World Alive (novel), a novel by Steve Earle